is a Japanese footballer who plays for Júbilo Iwata.

Club statistics
Updated to 8 August 2022.

References

External links
Profile at Júbilo Iwata

1991 births
Living people
Meiji University alumni
Association football people from Shizuoka Prefecture
Japanese footballers
J1 League players
J2 League players
Júbilo Iwata players
Association football defenders
Universiade bronze medalists for Japan
Universiade medalists in football
Medalists at the 2013 Summer Universiade